Gerocarne is a comune (municipality) in the Province of Vibo Valentia in the Italian region Calabria, located about  southwest of Catanzaro and about  southeast of Vibo Valentia.

Gerocarne borders the following municipalities: Arena, Dasà, Dinami, Francica, Mileto, Serra San Bruno, Sorianello, Soriano Calabro, Spadola, Stefanaconi.

Demographic evolution

References

Cities and towns in Calabria